The North American Lutheran Seminary (NALS) is the seminary system of the North American Lutheran Church. The proposal resulted from the work of NALC's Task Force for Theological Education and recommended two components for the seminary system. The seminary describes itself as "not investing in bricks and mortar, but rather investing in people". As such it has no buildings of its own.

History
In 2012, the Joint Commission on Theology and Doctrine of the NALC recommended the formation of a Commission on Theological Education. This was approved by the NALC's Executive Council and was appointed with Dr. Roy Harisville III as chair. The Commission on Theological Education recommended the creation of a seminary. The proposal was approved at the NALC convention held on August 8–9, 2013, in Pittsburgh, Pennsylvania. In 2013, the Rev. Dr. Amy C. Schifrin  was called as the seminary system's first president. In 2019, the Rev. Dr. Eric M. Riesen was called as its second president.

Organization
The seminary system operates similar to a wheel, with a hub and spokes. The hub is the seminary center located at Trinity School for Ministry in Ambridge, Pennsylvania. The spokes are various partner institutions in NALC mission districts. In 2013, the NALS began its first House of Studies in Charlotte, North Carolina, on the campus of Gordon-Conwell Theological Seminary. This was discontinued effective May 31, 2016. The seminary system has since formed several memoranda of understanding with various institutions, including: Concordia College New York in Bronxville, New York; Concordia University of Edmonton in Edmonton, Alberta; Concordia University St. Paul in St. Paul, Minnesota; and Grand View University in Des Moines, Iowa.

Academic information
The NALS offers degrees through its relationship with Trinity School for Ministry, which is accredited by the Association of Theological Schools in the United States and Canada and is a charter member of the Evangelical Council for Financial Accountability.

Degree programs
Master of Divinity (M.Div.) - available on campus or online (a 1-year residency is required)
Master of Arts in Religion (M.A.R.) - available on campus or online

Diploma and certificate programs
Diploma in Lutheran Studies - available on campus or online
Certificate in Lutheran Studies - available on campus or online

The seminary also offers individual courses to supplement the educational requirements needed for those in the candidacy process to become ordained pastors in the North American Lutheran Church.

References

External links

North American Lutheran Church
Seminaries and theological colleges in Pennsylvania
Lutheran seminaries
Lutheran buildings and structures in North America
Educational institutions established in 2013
Universities and colleges in Beaver County, Pennsylvania
2013 establishments in Pennsylvania